Rukhadze is a Georgian surname. Notable people with the surname include:

 David Rukhadze (born 1963), Georgian footballer
 Henri Rukhadze (1930–2018), Soviet and Russian physicist

Georgian-language surnames
Surnames of Georgian origin